Parrhasius (Greek: Παρράσιος) may refer to:

 Persons:
 Parrhasius (painter), a famous painter who worked in Athens in the late 5th century BC
 Janus Parrhasius (1470–1522), Italian humanist scholar
 Parrhasius (son of Lycaon), in mythology, a son of Lycaon, from whom Parrhasia (Arcadia) was believed to have derived its name

 Taxonomy:
 Parrhasius (butterfly), a butterfly genus